Köflach is a small city in the district of Voitsberg in the Austrian state of Styria, at the foot of the Stubalpe mountain. The town has a federal stud in the village of Piber that supplies the Lipizzaner horses to the famous Spanish Riding School in Vienna. Traditionally known for its coal mining, Köflach is slowly changing from an industrial town to a center of the service sector. It is connected by rail to Voitsberg.

Population

Sights 

The main attractions are "Bundesgestüt Piber" (Piber Federal Stud) with its famous white Lipizzaner horses and the thermal bath "Therme Nova" which is supplied from mineral spring in Piber.

Also a point of interest is the House of Art and Culture which holds exhibitions, mostly of local artists.

Infrastructure 

Köflach has a railway terminal, it is the first station of the railroad between Köflach and Graz. 

The nearest Autobahn (Freeway) is the "A2 Südautobahn", the nearest connections are "Modriach" and "Mooskirchen". The most important Roads are the "B70 Packerbundesstraße" connecting Köflach with Graz and Villach and the  "B77 Gaberl Straße".

Economy 

The important industrial sites are Stölzle Oberglas, producer of glass, and LEAR, producer of car seats (especially for Magna Steyr).

Twin towns

 Giengen an der Brenz, Germany, since 1962

Sons and daughters
 Ferdinand Pamberger (1873-1956), painter and graphic artist
 Hannah Perschel (born 1940), artist
 Stefanie Werger (born 1951), musician, author and actress
 Leo Lukas (born 1959), cabaret artist and writer
 Hannah Scheucher (born 1993), graphic designer
 Edmund Dittmer (born 1956), wine friend
 Hubert Eisner (born 1897-?), Austrian Nazi

Other members of the community history

 Viktor Elser (1893-1979), national politician, national councilor of the council (mayor of 1924-1934)
 Anton Lukesch (1912-2003) and Karl Lukesch (1917-1991), missionaries and South American researchers

References

See also
Green Boots

Cities and towns in Voitsberg District
Lavanttal Alps